Helen Jane Gilyard (born 1963), is a female former swimmer who competed for England.

Swimming career
Gilyard represented England and won a bronze medal in the 4 x 100 metres medley relay, at the 1978 Commonwealth Games in Edmonton, Alberta, Canada.

References

1961 births
Living people
English female swimmers
Commonwealth Games medallists in swimming
Commonwealth Games bronze medallists for England
Swimmers at the 1978 Commonwealth Games
Medallists at the 1978 Commonwealth Games